Lyrics, Legal and Miscellaneous is a book by the Scottish humourist and advocate George Outram, which was posthumously published in 1874.

1874 non-fiction books
Comedy books